Acraea marnois is a butterfly in the family Nymphalidae. It is found in Sudan.

Description

A. marnois Rog., which I formerly incorrectly regarded as a form of oncaea, is, as Eltringham has discovered, very nearly allied to Acraea caecilia and probably only a form of it. Wings above sand-yellow; at the base narrowly blackish; the black colour does not reach vein 2; at the apex and distal margin narrowly darkened, but much more broadly than in caecilia pudora; basal and discal dots on both wings as in caecilia. Soudan.

Taxonomy
It is a member of the Acraea caecilia species group. See also Pierre & Bernaud, 2014. Junior synonym of Acraea caecilia.

References

Butterflies described in 1890
marnois
Endemic fauna of Sudan
Butterflies of Africa